Edward Gerrard (1 December 1900–1987) was an English footballer who played in the Football League for Preston North End.

References

1900 births
1987 deaths
English footballers
Association football midfielders
English Football League players
Preston North End F.C. players